The term "Laureate" is associated with nationally or globally recognized achievements in the humanities or sciences, and also with military glory.

"Laureate" could also refer to: 

Laureate Academy, a secondary school in Hemel Hempstead, Hertfordshire, England
Laureate Education, an American public-benefit corporation
The Laureate, an upcoming British film about poet Robert Graves